Phra Mahachai Phraisop (Thai: พระมหาไชไพรสภ), also known as Phra Mahachai (Thai: พระมหาไชย) or Phra Phraiprasop (Thai: พระไพรประสบ), is the god of rice or the deity who protects rice according to Thai beliefs and has the same characteristics and duties as Mae Phosop, the goddess of rice.

Characteristics 

Phra Mahachai Phraisop appears in the textbook of images of idols (ตำราภาพเทวรูป). It is a Thai book written during the reign of King Mongkut and appears in Narai Narai Yisip Pang (นารายณ์ยี่สิบปาง). The deity resembles a male holding a mature rice sheaf in one hand and holding a dagger.It is believed that Phra Mahachai Phraisop developed from Mae Phosop, who was originally a female. Due to the social dynamics at the time that believed that males were greater than females, it was transformed into a male. Like the Tai Khong (ใต้คง) people in Yunnan, there was a male deity of rice called Pu Khwan Khao (ปู่ขวัญข้าว), which Siraphon Na Thalang assumed that this belief may have been influenced by Chinese patriarchal culture.

There is a painting of Phra Mahachai Phraisop in front of the Chai Chumphon Throne Hall in the Grand Palace.

References 

Agricultural gods
Thai deities